Proclydonautilus is a genus of nautiloids belonging to the Clydonautilidae known from the Upper Triassic of North America, Europe, and India.

The shell of Proclydonautilus, like those of other  Clydonautilitidae, is involute and smooth. It is distinguished by its suture which has a broad, shallow to deep ventral lobe that divides a large ventral saddle. A large lateral lobe on the flans is followed by a small lateral saddle and a second lateral lobe.

With regard to the suture Proclydonautilus is most similar to Cosmonautilus and Callaionautilus, both also from the Late Triassic.

References

 Berhard Kummel, 1964. Nautiloidea-Nautilida. Treatise on Invertebrate Paleontology, Part K. Geological Society of America.

Prehistoric nautiloid genera